Yvan Rajoarimanana Avotriniaina (born August 23, 1988) is a Malagasy footballer who currently plays CNaPS Sport.

Career 
Rajoarimanana started his football career with Ajesaia. He played one year with Ajessaia in the Ligue one before joined to JS Saint-Pierroise. Rajoarimanana played two years in the Réunion Premier League, before returned to Madagascar and signed with CNaPS Sport Itasy.

International
He was from 2008 to 2011 member of the Madagascar national football team and played twelve games for them.

International goals
Scores and results list Madagascar's goal tally first.

Honours

Club
Ajesaia
 THB Champions League (1) : Champion : 2007 
 Super Coupe de Madagascar (1) : 2007 

JS Saint-Pierroise
 Réunion Premier League (2) : 2008,2015

CNaPS Sport
 THB Champions League (1): 2013
 Coupe de Madagascar (1): 2011

AS Saint-Michel Elgeco Plus
 Coupe de Madagascar (1): 2014

National team
 COSAFA CUP U20 (1) : COSAFA U-20 Challenge Cup 2005

Notes

1988 births
Living people
Malagasy footballers
Association football forwards
JS Saint-Pierroise players
CNaPS Sport players
Ajesaia players
Japan Actuel's FC players
Madagascar international footballers
Malagasy expatriate footballers
Malagasy expatriate sportspeople in Réunion
Expatriate footballers in Réunion